The state government of Georgia is the U.S. state governmental body established by the Georgia State Constitution. It is a republican form of government with three branches: the legislature, executive, and judiciary. Through a system of separation of powers or "checks and balances", each of these branches has some authority to act on its own, some authority to regulate the other two branches, and has some of its own authority, in turn, regulated by the other branches. The seat of government for Georgia is located in Atlanta.

Executive
The current statewide elected officials are as follows:

The main executive official in Georgia is the Governor. They are elected by the voters of the state for a term of four years. No person may hold the office more than twice consecutively. The governor oversees the state budget and thus possesses great power over all state finances. Additionally, the governor is responsible for the nomination of over a thousand officials to a variety of positions in state government, one of the largest rosters of any U.S. state. Those nominated must be approved by the state legislature. Regulations are codified in the Rules and Regulations of the State of Georgia.

Agencies

There are several departments, agencies and other entities within the government, including the:

 Georgia Department of Administrative Services
 Georgia Department of Agriculture
 Georgia Department of Audits and Accounts
 Georgia Department of Banking and Finance
 Georgia Department of Behavioral Health and Developmental Disabilities
 Georgia Bureau of Investigation
 Georgia Department of Community Affairs
 Georgia Department of Community Health
Georgia Department of Community Supervision
 Georgia Department of Corrections
 Georgia Department of Defense
 Georgia Development Authority
 Georgia Department of Driver Services
 Georgia Department of Early Care and Learning 
 Georgia Department of Economic Development
 Georgia Department of Education
 Georgia Department of Human Services
 Georgia Department of Insurance
 Georgia Department of Juvenile Justice
 Georgia Department of Labor
 Georgia Department of Natural Resources
 Georgia Department of Public Health
 Georgia Department of Public Safety
Georgia Public Service Commission
 Georgia Department of Revenue
 Georgia Department of Transportation
 Georgia Department of Veterans Service

Legislature

The legislature of Georgia is the General Assembly, a bicameral body consisting of the Senate and the House of Representatives. The Senate has 56 members and the House has 180 members. Lawmakers serve 2-year terms and work part-time. Each member of the legislature represents geographically distinct districts from which each voter may give support to one candidate for each body. For most of its history, the state used an unusual county unit system by which districts were drawn such that each had the same area. However, population growth in cities across the state led to the rural population, which was in relative decline, having disproportionate power in government. After the U.S. Supreme Court declared such unequal representation to be unconstitutional in Gray v. Sanders in 1963, state officials began to redefine legislative districts so that each had a similarly sized population. Both senators and representatives have terms of two years. There are no limits on the number of terms any person may serve. Its legislative acts, generically called "chapter laws" or "slip laws" when printed separately, are published in the official Georgia Laws and are called "session laws". These in turn have been codified in the Official Code of Georgia Annotated (O.C.G.A.).

From bill to law

The General Assembly transforms bills into laws. A bill is created after citizens contact their representatives about an issue they care about. The legislator drafts a bill that addresses the concerns of citizens. The lawmaker sponsors the bill and files it with either the Clerk of the House or Secretary of Senate to be registered, introduced, and assigned to a committee for review. While in committee, public testimonies and commentary are presented to the committee. After studying the bill, the committee will recommend one of the following: to pass, not pass, pass with changes, or hold bill during its second reading. The bill will proceed to its third reading if viewed favorably by the committee. Bills will be called to the floor for the first ten days of a session. After the tenth day, the Rules Committee starts prioritizing bills to be called. The Rules Committee prepares which bills will be called to the floor on the next day. Once on the floor, the General Assembly may vote and/or make amendments. The bill requires a majority vote to pass through the chamber it originated from by Crossover Day, which is the 30th day in session. Bills that do not advance to the other chamber by this day will not be considered for the remainder of the session. Both the House and Senate follow these rules before sending it to the other house for review. The bills continues to be amendment until both sides can agree on the same version of the bill. Once this is reached, the bill is sent to the governor to be enacted or vetoed, which in the latter case will require a  majority vote from both houses to overcome the veto. The bill is usually sent to the governor after sine die, the last day of the legislative session. The governor has 40 days to approve or veto the bill after sine die before it is automatically enacted. If the bill is requested to arrive at the governor's desk earlier than sine die, the governor must sign. If the bill is sent to the governor during the session, the governor has six days to sign before the bill becomes a law. The law is enacted on July 1.

Judiciary

The highest judiciary power in Georgia is the Supreme Court, which is composed of nine judges. The state also has a Court of Appeals made of 12 judges. Georgia is divided into 49 judicial circuits, each of which has a Superior Court consisting of local judges numbering between two and 19 depending on the circuit population. Under the 1983 Constitution, Georgia also has magistrate courts, probate courts, juvenile courts, state courts; the General Assembly may also authorize municipal courts.  Other courts, including county recorder's courts, civil courts and other agencies in existence on June 30, 1983, may continue with the same jurisdiction until otherwise provided by law.

Each county in Georgia has at least one superior court, magistrate court, probate court, and where needed a state court and a juvenile court; in the absence of a state court or a juvenile court, the superior court exercises that jurisdiction.

All serving judges are elected by popular vote either from the entire state in the cases of the Supreme Court and the Court of Appeals or from a given circuit in the case of Superior Courts. Judges of the Supreme Court and the Court of Appeals serve for terms of six years. Judges of other courts serve for terms of four years.

Local government

The Georgia Constitution grants cities and counties a significant amount of home rule authority.

Counties

Georgia is divided into 159 counties, more than any other U.S. state except Texas. Among all counties, 149 of them are governed by a committee made of between three and eleven commissioners. The other 10 counties are overseen by a single commissioner. All commissioners are elected by the voters of their county for terms that range between two and six years with most counties having terms lasting four years. Serving members wield both executive and legislative power in their county.

Cities

Most of the 536 cities in Georgia are governed by a mayor–council system.  All municipalities in the state are considered cities. Most basic public services rendered outside of the cities are provided by the counties.

See also

 Elections in Georgia (U.S. state)
 Politics of Georgia (U.S. state)
 Law of Georgia (U.S. state)
 List of state government committees of Georgia (U.S. state)

References

External links
 GeorgiaGov
 Georgia General Assembly
 Georgia Supreme Court
 State of Georgia recipient profile on USAspending.gov

 
Georgia